Daniel Olcina Olcina (born 25 January 1989) is a Spanish former football winger.

Football career
Olcina was born in Albaida, Valencia. A product of Valencia CF's youth ranks, he made his debut for the first team on 27 August 2009, when he came on as a substitute in the UEFA Europa League match against Stabæk Fotball, a 4–1 home win for the play-off round.

Released by the Che in the summer of 2011 without any further competitive appearances, Olcina resumed his career in the lower leagues in his native region. He also had abroad spells in Belarus and Nicaragua.

In 2018 he signed a contract in china to be coach of the sprout football club

References

External links

https://golsmedia.com/comunidad-valenciana/valencianos-por-el-mundo/2019/12/09/dani-olcina-jugadores-chinos-adoran-espanoles-tambien-debes-ganartelos/
1989 births
Living people
People from Vall d'Albaida
Sportspeople from the Province of Valencia
Spanish footballers
Footballers from the Valencian Community
Association football wingers
Segunda División B players
Tercera División players
Valencia CF Mestalla footballers
Valencia CF players
CD Alcoyano footballers
CD Olímpic de Xàtiva footballers
Ontinyent CF players
CF Torre Levante players
Belarusian Premier League players
FC Torpedo-BelAZ Zhodino players
Diriangén FC players
Spain youth international footballers
Spanish expatriate footballers
Expatriate footballers in Belarus
Expatriate footballers in Nicaragua
https://golsmedia.com/comunidad-valenciana/futbol/cf-torre-levante/2018/11/03/dani-olcina-marcha-torre-levante-para-entrenar-china/